Karla Satchell, born Karla Fullner, is an American microbiologist who is currently a professor at Northwestern University Feinberg School of Medicine and an elected fellow of the American Association for the Advancement of Science.

Education
She earned her Ph.D at University of Washington in 1996 and conducted postdoctoral training with John Mekalanos at Harvard Medical School.

Research
Her interests are bacteriology, structural biology, and immunology, cytoskeleton, cellular microbiology, bacteria and diseases and pathogenesis. She is especially known for defining how the MARTX toxin in Vibrio cholerae is a modular protein that delivers its constituent effectors to host cells.

Immunology
Satchell is head of the Center for Structural Genomics of Infectious Diseases at Northwestern.  The Center, established in 2007, provides an established consortium of laboratories in North America for rapid response research related to infectious disease outbreaks. It maps and examines the genomes of disease causing agents such as viruses to establish effective treatments.

Publications
Kerri-Lynn Sheahan, Christina L. Cordero, and Karla J. Fullner Satchell. Identification of a domain within the multifunctional Vibrio cholerae RTX toxin that covalently cross-links actin. PNAS. vol. 101 no. 26. 9798–9803
KJF Satchell. MARTX, multifunctional autoprocessing repeats-in-toxin toxins. Infection and immunity. November 2007 vol. 75 no. 11 5079-5084.

Awards and honors 

 2006 Investigator in Pathogenesis of Infectious Disease, Burroughs Wellcome Fund
 2014 Elected a Fellow of the American Academy of Microbiology
 2016 Driskill Graduate Program Dean's Outstanding Teacher Award, Northwestern Feinberg School of Medicine
 2017 Elected a Fellow of the American Association for the Advancement of Science

References

Year of birth missing (living people)
Living people
Fellows of the American Association for the Advancement of Science
Northwestern University faculty
American microbiologists
University of Washington alumni
Women microbiologists
Fellows of the American Academy of Microbiology